The 16th World Science Fiction Convention (Worldcon), also known as Solacon, was held on 29 August–1 September 1958 at the Alexandria Hotel in Los Angeles, California, United States.

Solacon's chair was Anne S. Moffatt.

Participants 

Attendance was 322.

Guests of Honor 

 Richard Matheson
 Anthony Boucher (toastmaster)

Awards

1958 Hugo Awards 

For the 1958 Hugos, Solacon presented engraved Hugo Award plaques instead of the nickel-plated Hugo rockets mounted on wooden bases, like those presented at the previous Worldcons in 1953, 1955, 1956, and 1957 (no awards were given in 1954).

The winners were:

 Best Novel/Novelette: The Big Time, by Fritz Leiber
 Best Short Story: "Or All the Seas with Oysters", by Avram Davidson
 Best Professional Magazine: The Magazine of Fantasy & Science Fiction, edited by Anthony Boucher and Robert P. Mills
 Outstanding Movie: The Incredible Shrinking Man, directed by Jack Arnold; screenplay by Richard Matheson
 Outstanding Artist: Frank Kelly Freas
 Outstanding Actifan: Walt Willis

Notes 

Solacon was physically in Los Angeles, but (by mayoral proclamation) technically in South Gate, California, to fulfill their longtime bid slogan (since 1948) of "South Gate in '58."

Superfan Rick Sneary had a cardboard sign at this convention that read "We'll do it again in 2010" that he carried to numerous future Worldcons. His death in 1990 laid that dream to rest and the 2010 Worldcon took place in Melbourne, Australia.

See also 

 Hugo Award
 Science fiction
 Speculative fiction
 World Science Fiction Society
 Worldcon

References

External links 

 NESFA.org: 1958 convention notes

1958 conferences
1958 in California
Science fiction conventions in the United States
Worldcon